Chaman Singh Gurung was a member of the 1952 Helsinki Olympics hockey team that won the gold medal. He was educated in Goethals Memorial School, Kurseong and after retiring from the game he went on to be the games master in his Alma Mater.

References

External links
 

Olympic field hockey players of India
Olympic gold medalists for India
Field hockey players at the 1952 Summer Olympics
Indian male field hockey players
Olympic medalists in field hockey
Medalists at the 1952 Summer Olympics
Indian Gorkhas
People from Darjeeling district
Field hockey players from West Bengal
Possibly living people
Year of birth missing
Gurung people